Stephen Augustus Libby (December 8, 1853 – March 31, 1935) was a baseball player for the Buffalo Bisons of the National League for one game during the 1879 season. He also served as an umpire in the National League for one game in 1879 and eight more in 1880, all of them as the home plate umpire.

References

External links
Baseball Reference

1853 births
1935 deaths
Baseball players from Maine
Major League Baseball first basemen
Buffalo Bisons (NL) players
19th-century baseball players
People from Scarborough, Maine
Major League Baseball umpires
Fall River Casscade players
Buffalo (minor league baseball) players